Hemaris syra, the broad-bordered bee hawkmoth, is a moth of the family Sphingidae. The species was first described by Franz Daniel in 1939. It is known from southern and eastern Turkey, the western Zagros Mountains and northern Alborz Mountains of Iran, the Kopet Dag mountains of Turkmenistan, western Jordan, and northern Israel. The habitat consists of open remnants of former woodland, especially where Lonicera grows through and over low shrubs. It occurs at around 1,000 meters altitude in southern Turkey and from 1500 to 1600 meters in northern Israel.

The wingspan is 35–48 mm. It is a diurnal species. Adults are on wing from mid-May to mid-June, with a partial to full second generation in August.

The larvae probably feed on Lonicera species.

References

S
Moths of Asia
Moths of the Middle East
Insects of Turkey
Moths described in 1836